Maksim Vasiljević (Serbian Cyrillic: Максим Васиљевић; born 27 June 1968 as Milan Vasiljević) is the Bishop of the Eparchy of Western America of the Serbian Orthodox Church.

Previously, he had occupied the throne of the vicar bishop of Hum, in the Metropolitanate of Dabar-Bosnia, in Republika Srpska, Bosnia and Herzegovina. He used to lecture at the Orthodox Theological Faculty in Foča. He taught Patristics for thirteen years at the University of Belgrade's School of Orthodox Theology. In 2019, he was discharged from the university position.

He was enthroned by Bishop Longin of the New Gračanica Metropolitanate, in the Cathedral of St. Stefan the First-Crowned in Alhambra, California. He also succeeded Bishop Longin, who previously served as the Administrator of the diocese. Bishop Maksim was elected to the see of the Serbian Orthodox Eparchy of Western America at the regular session of the Holy Assembly of Bishops of the Serbian Orthodox Church, held sometime in May 2006.

Selected works

References

External links

 Official website of the Serbian Diocese of Western America

 

1968 births
Living people
People from Foča
Serbs of Bosnia and Herzegovina
Bishops of the Serbian Orthodox Church
Serbian Orthodox Church in the United States
Eastern Orthodox bishops in the United States
Eastern Orthodox Christians from Bosnia and Herzegovina
Academic staff of the University of Belgrade